To Die For is a studio album by the American metallic hardcore band Integrity. The album was released on September 23, 2003 through Deathwish Inc.—a label that was founded by Jacob Bannon of Converge who also designed the album's cover art. To Die For was seen as Integrity's "comeback album" as it was the band's first release of new material after having recently reformed.

Track listing

References

2003 albums
Deathwish Inc. albums
Albums with cover art by Jacob Bannon